Glen Frederick Skov (January 26, 1931 – September 10, 2013) was a professional ice hockey centre who played 12 seasons in the National Hockey League (NHL) for the Detroit Red Wings, Chicago Black Hawks and Montreal Canadiens. Skov won three Stanley Cup championships with Detroit in 1952, 1954 and 1955. His was the younger brother of referee Art Skov. 

Skov split his first two seasons between Detroit and the minor leagues before playing four full seasons with Detroit. He then moved to Chicago where he played for five seasons. His final season comprised a mere three games with the Montreal Canadiens. He died on September 10, 2013, in Palm Harbor, Florida.

Career statistics

References

External links

1931 births
2013 deaths
Canadian ice hockey centres
Chicago Blackhawks players
Detroit Red Wings players
Montreal Canadiens players
Omaha Knights (USHL) players
Stanley Cup champions
Ice hockey people from Ontario
Sportspeople from Chatham-Kent